Morphin may refer to the following:

 Morphing, a graphics effect where one image seamlessly transitions into another
 Morphine, a potent opiate analgesic and psychoactive drug
 Morphin, the name of transformation sequence in the Power Rangers franchise
  Mighty Morphin Power Rangers

See also 
 Morph (disambiguation)